Anselmo Alliegro y Milá (March 16, 1899 – November 22, 1961) was a Cuban politician who served as the Interim President of Cuba for one day (1 – 2 January 1959) after the departure of the President, General Fulgencio Batista, from the country.

He previously held the position of President of the Senate of Cuba from February 1955 to 1 January 1959. He also served as Prime Minister of Cuba in 1944. He was also Mayor of the town of Baracoa, Representative in the Cuban Congress of 1925, 1940, 1945; Minister of Commerce 1942, Minister of Education, and Minister of Housing.

Alliegro was the son of  an Italian, Miguel Alliegro Esculpino and a Spaniard, Donatila Milá. He was married to Ana Durán with whom he had one child, Anselmo Leon Alliegro Jr. He also had a daughter, Rosa Maria "Polita" Alliegro y Sanchez, from his previous marriage to Rosa M. Sanchez and a step-son, Alfredo G. Duran, a product of his wife Anita Duran's first marriage.

References

  (Spanish)
  (Spanish)

Presidents of Cuba
1959 in Cuba
Government ministers of Cuba
1899 births
1961 deaths
Presidents of the Senate of Cuba
Members of the Cuban House of Representatives
Mayors of places in Cuba
People of the Cuban Revolution
Exiles of the Cuban Revolution in the United States
People from Yaguajay
Cuban people of Italian descent
1950s in Cuba
20th-century Cuban politicians